Stan Eve (18 December 1925 – 27 January 1990) was an English cricketer. He played for Essex between 1950 and 1957.

References

External links

1925 births
1990 deaths
English cricketers
Essex cricketers
People from Stepney
Cricketers from Greater London